Acrotaenia testudinea is a species of tephritid or fruit flies in the genus Acrotaenia of the family Tephritidae.

Distribution
United States, Greater Antilles.

References

Tephritinae
Insects described in 1873
Diptera of North America